The Kannada Wikipedia is the Kannada-language edition of Wikipedia. It is the twelfth-most popular Wikipedia in the Indian subcontinent.

The Kannada Wikipedia community held a meeting in Bangalore on April 2, 2006, which got fairly high press coverage.

History

As of August 16, 2009 the Kannada Wikipedia had about 6,800 articles, making it the 100th-biggest Wikipedia edition.

As of January 2016, the Kannada Wikipedia is the tenth-largest and, thus, the smallest Wikipedia among other Indian-language Wikipedias. Administrator Omshivaprakash attributes the lack of articles to a lack of interest among the Kannada-speaking community, a lack of awareness of the Kannada Wikipedia and Kannada typing tools, and limited Internet access in parts of Karnataka.

Users and editors

See also
 Telugu Wikipedia
 Tamil Wikipedia
 Malayalam Wikipedia
 Tulu Wikipedia
 Marathi Wikipedia

References

  ಅಂತರ್ಜಾಲದಲ್ಲಿ ನೆಟ್ಟ ಸಸಿಗೆ ಈಗ ಹತ್ತು ವರ್ಷ | - Kannadaprabha.com

Further reading
 Statistics for Kannada Wikipedia by Erik Zachte

External links 

Kannada Wikipedia

Wikipedias by language
Internet properties established in 2003
Kannada-language mass media
Indian encyclopedias
Wikipedia in India